Problem-Solving Group (PSG) is a team of problem management and technical support staff that is formed to investigate and diagnose a recurring IT problem.

Background

The concept of the Problem-Solving Group was introduced in ITIL Service Operation 2007 but was removed from ITIL Service Operation 2011.

Definition

The ITIL Service Operation manual describes the purpose of a Problem-Solving Group as follows:

A paper with a more detailed description of a PSG was presented at a meeting of the British Computer Society at the University of Northampton.

See also

 ITIL v3 problem management

References

Information technology management